La Salle Catholic College Preparatory is a private co-ed Roman Catholic College Preparatory School in Milwaukie, Oregon, near Portland. Under the Archdiocese of Portland, the Brothers of the Christian Schools established La Salle in 1966 as part of their worldwide network of schools. The school has been accredited by the Northwest Accreditation Commission since 1979.

Facility
In 2010, the school installed a 98-kilowatt solar system using funding from a subsidiary of MDU Resources. The system provides 10-20% of the school's power.

Academics
La Salle Preparatory offers 14 Advanced Placement (AP) courses in addition to fifteen honors courses, including some honors courses in which students are eligible to receive college credit for courses from various Portland area colleges and transfer the credit to their college upon graduation from the school.

La Salle offers a variety of clubs and programs in addition to its athletic programs, including: Drama, Art, ASB/Council, Lasallian Ministry, Earth Club, National Honor Society, Chess Club, and Community Service.  The school offers its students a chance to participate in competitive educational immersion programs, such as Harvard Model Congress, Lasallian Student Leaders, and Lasallian Youth Assembly, as well as language immersion programs over the summer to Germany, France, and Costa Rica. The school also offers a  student counseling and planning program, employing three personal counselors, a student advancement director, and two college counselors.

Athletics
La Salle has won thirty-one state championships in varsity athletics.

State championships
 Chess: 2012, 2014, 2015, 2016
 Boys doubles racquetball (National Championships): 2006
 Boys soccer: 1994, 1998, 1999, 2004, 2009, 2019, 2021
 Boys golf: 1989, 1991, 2015

Notable alumni
 Michael Cassidy, 2001, actor
 Ryan Cochrane, 2001, Major League Soccer player
 Matthew Dickman, 1993, poet
 James Whalen, 1996, professional football player

References

Catholic secondary schools in Oregon
Educational institutions established in 1966
Milwaukie, Oregon
High schools in Clackamas County, Oregon
Schools accredited by the Northwest Accreditation Commission
1966 establishments in Oregon
Roman Catholic Archdiocese of Portland in Oregon
Lasallian schools in the United States